Birger Dannevig (24 December 1921 – 23 May 1998) was a Norwegian journalist and historian. He was born in Arendal as the son of Alf Nicolay Dannevig and Sofie Marie Knudsen. He published a total of 54 books, mainly on the history of shipping, including Farsunds sjøfarts historie from 1967, Skip og menn from 1968, and Grimstads sjøfarts historie from 1971. During the Occupation of Norway by Nazi Germany he chaired the local chapter of the clandestine intelligence organisation XU.

References

1921 births
1998 deaths
People from Arendal
20th-century Norwegian historians
Norwegian resistance members
XU
20th-century Norwegian journalists